The 2016 Tour La Provence was a road cycling stage race that took place between 23 and 25 February 2016. The race was rated as a 2.1 event as part of the 2016 UCI Europe Tour, and was the first edition of the Tour La Provence.

Teams
Eighteen teams of up to eight riders started the race:

Route

Final ranking

References

External links

2016
2016 UCI Europe Tour
2016 in French sport
February 2016 sports events in France